Reinhardtia is a genus in the palm family native to the northern Neotropics.  It is a primarily Central American genus with five species distributed between southern Mexico and the extreme north of Colombia, and one isolated species, Reinhardtia paiewonskiana in the southwest of the Dominican Republic.

 Reinhardtia elegans Liebm. - Oaxaca, Chiapas, Honduras
 Reinhardtia gracilis (H.Wendl.) Burret - Central America, Oaxaca, Chiapas, Veracruz, Colombia
 Reinhardtia koschnyana  (H.Wendl. & Dammer) Burret - Honduras, Nicaragua, Costa Rica, Panama, Colombia
 Reinhardtia latisecta  (H.Wendl.) Burret - Belize, Honduras, Nicaragua, Costa Rica
 Reinhardtia paiewonskiana Read, Zanoni & M.M.Mejía - Dominican Republic
 Reinhardtia simplex (H.Wendl.) Burret - Chiapas, Honduras, Nicaragua, Costa Rica, Panama, Colombia

References

 

Arecaceae genera
Arecoideae